HLHS may refer to:
 Hypoplastic left heart syndrome, a rare congenital heart defect
 Hunters Lane High School, Nashville, Tennessee, United States
 National Hualien Senior High School, a senior high school in Hualien City, Taiwan